School Friend was the name of two different British weekly publications marketed toward girls, both of which were pioneering in their respective categories. The first School Friend, published from 1919 to 1929, was the first story paper marketed exclusively to girls. The second School Friend, published from 1950 to 1965, is considered the first British girls' comic. Although both published by Amalgamated Press, and both marketed toward girls, the content of the two publications was not directly related.

Story paper

School Friend the story paper focused on the Cliff House School for Girls, a fictional school first introduced ten years earlier in the boys' story paper The Magnet. With the success of Amalgamated Press (AP)'s boys' story papers like The Magnet and The Gem, the publisher was seeking to expand into new markets. AP editor Reg Eves, impressed by the letters he received from female readers of The Magnet, launched School Friend in 1919, becoming its first editor.

The School Friend was published in two series, from 17 May 1919 to 28 February 1925, for a total of 303 issues; and 7 March 1925 to 27 July 1929 for a total of 229 issues. (The series resumed the next week in the new publication The Schoolgirl.) Regular characters in the Cliff House stories included Billy Bunter's sister, Bessie Bunter, and Majorie Hazeldene, both having been introduced in The Magnet; and new characters Barbara "Babs" Redfern, Clara Trevlyn, Mabs Lynn, Phyllis Howell, Pand Philippa Derwent.

Despite the female audience, Eves primarily used male writers, such as Charles Hamilton, whom he was familiar with from the boys' papers. Hamilton created and introduced most of School Friend's main characters; he wrote issues 1–4, 9, and 11, before he was pulled back to write full time at The Magnet. Later writers for School Friend were R.S. Kirkham, Horace Phillips, and L. E. Ransome (who wrote most Cliff House stories in the second half of the 1920s). Following the same practice as used in The Magnet, all stories in School Friend were written under the pen name "Hilda Richards" — she being the supposed sister of The Magnet's "Frank Richards."

Cliff House lost its cover feature status in the publication's second series, 1925 to 1929; School Friend's 1929 cancellation led to the relaunched girls' story paper, The Schoolgirl, which again featured Cliff House stories. The Schoolgirl continued until 18 May 1940, when paper rationing during the Second World War resulted in its merger with the fellow girls' story paper Girls' Crystal (which had debuted in 1935).

Comic book

The School Friend comic book, launched in May 1950, is considered the first British girls' comic, helping to start a wave that really took hold in the 1960s and 1970s.

The strip The Silent Three (originally called The Silent Three of St. Kit's), written by Horace Boyten and Stewart Pride, and originally illustrated by Evelyn Flinders, was featured in School Friend from 1950 to 1964. Three schoolgirls at St. Kit's boarding school — Betty Roland (mask #1), Joan Derwent (mask #2), and Peggy West (mask #3) — band together as a secret society against the tyranny of the head prefect, later also fighting crime wearing numbered masks and hooded green robes.

Bessie Bunter, the one link between the two publications, also appeared in a humor comic strip in School Friend.

The strip My Friend Sara — as "told by Wendy Lee" — took over the cover of School Friend from 1963 to the publication's merger with June in 1965.

Frank Redpath, later to become known as a poet, wrote scripts for the strip Lucky's Living Doll (later known as Lucky and Tina). Some of John M. Burns' earliest work in comics was for School Friend. Roland Davies,  Cecil Langley Doughty, Harry Hargreaves, and Tom Kerr were also contributing artists. Illustrators were recruited via such art agencies as Dick and Jack Wall, Danny and Pat Kelleher's Temple Art Agency, Barry Coker's Bardon Art Associates by, and Luis Llorente's Creaciones Ilustradas.

Writer Enid Blyton's The Secret Seven, about a group of child detectives, was serialized (with illustrations by Eric Parker) in 1965.

Publication history 
The School Friend girls' comic was launched with the issue of 20 May 1950. When Amalgamated Press was acquired by the Mirror Group in 1959, the title was continued by the group's newly formed comics division, Fleetway Publications.

In an ironic twist, the sister comic Girls' Crystal (launched by AP as a story paper in 1935, and converted to a comic book in 1953) was merged into School Friend in 1963, with the publication carrying the title School Friend and Girls' Crystal right through to the end. (The first iteration of School Friend, which was relaunched as The Schoolgirl, had merged into Girls' Crystal in 1940.)

School Friend lasted a total of 766 issues until January 1965, when it was merged with the IPC title June to form June and School Friend. The strips Bessie Bunter, Mam'selle X, Sindy, and The Strangest Stories Ever Told (featuring The Storyteller) continued on in the merged title. June and School Friend lasted until 1971, when the title reverted to June.

Nineteen School Friend annuals were published in the years 1952 to 1974, continuing for many years after the main title no longer existed. In addition, IPC published two June and School Friend Special Extras in 1965–1966, and then 11 June and School Friend Holiday Specials from 1966 to 1980 (skipping the years 1972 to 1976).

Picture Library
Under IPC's proprietorship, the digest-sized monthly School Friend Picture Library was published from February 1962 to 1965. Meanwhile, IPC had published the Schoolgirls' Picture Library digest from 16 July 1957 to 1965. With issue #328, coinciding with the merger of School Friend and June, that title became June and School Friend Picture Library, which published 36 issues in 1965–1966. With issue #364 (IPC having canceled the sister title Princess), that title became June and School Friend and Princess Picture Library, publishing 183 issues under that name. With issue #547 in 1969, the title reverted to June and School Friend Picture Library.

IPC produced five June and School Friend Picture Library Holiday Specials between 1966 and 1970.

Strips and stories

 Babs and the Family
 Bessie Bunter, by Jim Storrie
 Cherry and the Children by John Armstrong
 Dancers in Secret (1963)
 Dilly Dreem
 Dolly Diddle's Jolly Riddles (1964)
 The Gay Princess (1963)
 Jill Crusoe by Johnny Johnson and Roland Davies
 Jill of Sunnyhead Stables (1964)
 Kim — Dog of Mystery
 The Legend of Bell Mountain (1964)
 Lola's Golden Quest (1963)
 Lost in the Wild West (1964)
 Lucky's Living Doll (later Lucky and Tina) by Frank Redpath and Robert MacGillivray — continued in June 
 Mam'selle X — Fights for France (1964–1965) — Actress Avril Claire is not very popular in Occupied France, as she performs for the German troops. But what nobody knows is that she is in fact Mam'selle X, a member of the French Resistance. Continued in June and then Tammy.
 My Friend Sara (1963–1965) — "told by Wendy Lee"
 Mystery Dog of the Moors (1964)
 Prue's Pony (1963)
 Scamp by Harry Hargreaves
 The Silent Three (1950–1964) by Horace Boyten and Stewart Pride, and originally drawn by Evelyn Flinders
 Sindy ( 1963–1964) by Cecil Graveney — stories based on the popular doll; continued in June and School Friend by artist Phil Townsend
 The Strangest Stories Ever Told by such writers as Scott Goodall, Len Wenn, and Terence Magee; and various artists — featuring The Storyteller, a pipe-smoking teller of spooky stories. Continued in June and then Tammy.
 Terry Brent drawn by Cecil Langley Doughty
 That Girl Patsy (1963)
 Tracy Goes East (1963)

References

Notes

Citations

Sources
 
 
 
 
 
 
  
 
 
 
 Keen, Tommy. "Cliff House, Cliff House, Cliff House and Morcove," Collectors' Digest Annual (1979), pp. 48–55. Archived at the Friardale Website.

1919 establishments in the United Kingdom
1929 disestablishments in the United Kingdom
British comics titles
British girls' comics
Defunct British comics
Defunct magazines published in the United Kingdom
Magazines established in 1919
Magazines disestablished in 1929
Weekly magazines published in the United Kingdom